Czech Film Critics' Award for Best Actress is one of the awards given to the best Czech motion picture.

Winners

References

External links

Film awards for lead actress
Czech Film Critics' Awards
Awards established in 2014